= 東北 =

東北 means northeast in Chinese characters.

It may refer to:

- Northeast China, a geographical area of China
- Tōhoku region, a geographical area of Japan
